Josh Kemeny (born 29 November 1998) is an Australian rugby union player who plays for the  in Super Rugby. His playing position is flanker. He has signed for the Rebels squad in 2020. Kemeny played for Sydney (NRC team) under National Rugby Championship

Personal life
Kemeny is the nephew of Fox sports presenter Lara Pitt.

Super Rugby statistics

Reference list

External links
Rugby.com.au profile
itsrugby.co.uk profile

1998 births
Australian rugby union players
Living people
Rugby union flankers
Melbourne Rebels players
Sydney (NRC team) players